Pigritia murtfeldtella is a moth in the family Blastobasidae. It is found in the United States, including Maine, Ohio, Kentucky, Pennsylvania, Georgia, Missouri, Texas and California.

References

Moths described in 1874
Blastobasidae